A list of windmills in the Dutch province of South Holland.

 
South Holland